Sven-Erik Sjöstrand (born March 25, 1954), is a Swedish Left Party politician, member of the Riksdag 1998–2006.

References

Members of the Riksdag from the Left Party (Sweden)
Living people
1954 births
Members of the Riksdag 2002–2006
Place of birth missing (living people)
Members of the Riksdag 1998–2002
20th-century Swedish politicians
21st-century Swedish politicians